Ryback is a surname, a spelling variant of Rybak. Notable people with this surname include:

Casey Ryback, fictional Navy SEAL commando and counter-terrorist in the Under Siege films played by Steven Seagal
Issachar Ber Ryback, Ukrainian-French painter 
Timothy W. Ryback (21st century), American historian

See also
Rybak (disambiguation)
Ryback, ring name of Ryback Reeves (born 1981), is an American professional wrestler.

Jewish surnames
Slavic-language surnames